This is a complete list of United States senators during the 116th United States Congress listed by seniority, from January 3, 2019, to January 3, 2021. It is a historical listing and will contain people who have not served the entire two-year Congress should anyone resign, die, or be expelled.

In this Congress, Kyrsten Sinema is the most junior senior senator and Maria Cantwell is the most senior junior senator.

Order of service is based on the commencement of the senator's first term. Behind this is former service as a senator (only giving the senator seniority within his or her new incoming class), service as vice president, a House member, a cabinet secretary, or a governor of a state. The final factor is the population of the senator's state.

Terms of service

U.S. Senate seniority list

See also
 Seniority in the United States Senate
 116th United States Congress
 List of members of the United States House of Representatives in the 116th Congress by seniority

Notes

References

External links

116
Senate Seniority